is a Japanese manga artist. After winning an honorable mention at the 11th Tezuka Awards in 1976 for his work Mīnya no Negai, he made his professional debut the following year in a special issue of Weekly Shōnen Jump with his work . Since that time, he has published works in a variety of Shogakukan shōnen and seinen manga magazines.

His definitive works include Tsukiji Uogashi Sandaime (art) and Itsumo Hōkago. Manga artist Hidenori Hara was his assistant for a time. Hashimoto was the assistant for Motoka Murakami for a time.

Works
All works are published by Shogakukan unless otherwise indicated.
Ganbare! Donbe (1978–1980, CoroCoro Comic, 2 volumes)
Ore wa Namuzumono (1982–1984, written by Jūzō Yamasaki, Weekly Shōnen Sunday, 6 volumes)
Barairo Eleven (1985, Big Comic, 4 volumes)
Tensai Donbe (1986–1988, CoroCoro Comic, 8 volumes)
Itsumo Hōkago (1990-?, Big Comic, 7 volumes)
Fūfu Seikatsu (1990–1991, written by Yūji Nishi, Big Comic, 6 volumes)
Hanatare Gakuen (1991–1992, SP Comics, 2 volumes)
 (1992–1996, written by Ken'ichi Ōishi, Big Comic Original, 6 volumes)
Kibō no Isu (1996–1997, Big Comic, 2 volumes)
Mizcov (1996–2000, written by Gregory, Big Comic Original, 5 volumes)
Tōen (1999–2000, written by Daiki Harada, Big Comic Superior, 2 volumes)
Radio no Tantei (2000, written by Yūji Nishi, Big Comic, 1 volume)
Tsukiji Uogashi Sandaime (2000-current, written by Ken'ichi Ōishi (vol.1), Masaharu Nabeshima (vol.2-20), Kazuto Kuwa (vol.21-current), Big Comic, 26 volumes (as of March 2009))
Shuppatsu, Shingo!! (2006–2009, written by Yūichirō Sueda, Manga Time, 2 volumes, ja)
Tetsu no Hosomichi (2008-current, Comic Charge, Kadokawa Shoten, 2 volumes (as of March 2009), ja)

References

1955 births
Living people
Manga artists from Saitama Prefecture